The Glagolitic Mass (also called Missa Glagolitica or Slavonic Mass) is a composition for soloists (soprano, contralto, tenor, bass), double chorus, organ and orchestra by Leoš Janáček. The work was completed on 15 October 1926 and premiered by the Brno Arts Society, conducted by Jaroslav Kvapil, in Brno on 5 December 1927. Janáček revised the mass the next year. The Glagolitic Mass is one of the most remarkable and important musical religious works of the twentieth century.

The Glagolitic alphabet was an early Slavic alphabet, the predecessor of the modern Cyrillic alphabet. In Yugoslavia, the Catholic Church gave permission for the Roman Rite liturgical Mass to be celebrated in Old Church Slavonic at a time when such liturgies were typically only permitted to be in Latin, resulting in the Glagolitic Use Mass.

Background
The text is in Old Church Slavonic, with five vocal movements that correspond to the Catholic Ordinary of the Mass, omitting "Dona nobis pacem" in the Agnus Dei. The musical origins of the work can be traced to Janáček's Latin setting of the Kyrie, Agnus Dei, and Credo for organ and chorus. This was used as a dictation exercise by his composition students in 1908.

Janáček had extensive experience working with choirs, as well as writing a large amount of choral music. It begins and closes with triumphant fanfares dominated by the brass. In between these sections lies particularly vibrant and rhythmic writing for solo voices as well as choir. Curiously, the final movement is titled Intrada, which means entrance. Before this Intrada, Janáček introduces a dramatic organ solo of considerable originality – a moto perpetuo of wild energy. Janáček's Glagolitic Mass is considered an important work of the century and is frequently performed and recorded today.

Janáček was a strong supporter of pan-Slavism, and this mass has been viewed as a celebration of Slavic culture.

Structure

Its eight movements are:
 Úvod – Introduction (orchestra)
 Gospodi pomiluj – Kyrie
 Slava – Gloria
 Věruju – Credo
 Svet – Sanctus
 Agneče Božij – Agnus Dei
 Varhany sólo (Postludium) – Organ solo
 Intrada – Exodus (literally, entrance)
Although this version is considered the "standard" version performed today, research into Janáček's manuscripts suggests that the Intrada was intended to be played at the beginning of the work as well, creating a symmetric nine-movement form with the Věruju at its center. In addition, several other sections of the work were revealed to have been simplified in meter and orchestration. Some of the movements are reworkings of Janáček's earlier compositions: the Svet, for instance, is derived from the Sanctus of the composer's own Mass in E-flat.

Orchestration
The mass is scored for soprano, alto, tenor, and bass soloists, double SATB choir, and an orchestra of 4 flutes (2–4 doubling piccolos), 2 oboes, cor anglais, 3 clarinets (3rd doubling bass clarinet), 3 bassoons (3rd doubling contrabassoon), 4 horns, 4 trumpets, 3 trombones, tuba, timpani, glockenspiel, triangle, snare drum, cymbals, tam-tam, chimes, 2 harps, celesta, organ, and strings (1st & 2nd violins, violas, cellos, and double basses).

Recordings
 Břetislav Bakala conducting the Brno Radio Symphony Orchestra (rec. 1951, Supraphon)
 Leonard Bernstein conducting the New York Philharmonic (rec. 1963, Sony)
 Karel Ančerl conducting the Czech Philharmonic, (rec. April 1963, Supraphon)
 Rafael Kubelík conducting the Bavarian Radio Symphony Orchestra (rec. 1964, Deutsche Grammophon)
 Rudolf Kempe conducting the Royal Philharmonic Orchestra (rec.  May 1973 organ solo 6 August 1973, Decca)
 Václav Neumann conducting the Czech Philharmonic, (rec. 1978, Supraphon)
 František Jílek conducting the Brno State Philharmonic Orchestra (rec. 1979, Supraphon)
 Sir Simon Rattle conducting the City of Birmingham Symphony Orchestra (rec. 1981, EMI Classics)
 Sir Charles Mackerras conducting the Czech Philharmonic (rec. 1984, Supraphon)
 Michael Gielen conducting the SWR Symphony Orchestra (rec. 1988, Intercord)
 Robert Shaw conducting the Atlanta Symphony Orchestra and Chorus (rec. 1990, Telarc)
 Michael Tilson Thomas conducting the London Symphony Orchestra (rec. 1990, Sony)
 Kurt Masur conducting the Gewandhausorchester Leipzig (rec. 1991, Philips)
 Charles Dutoit conducting the Montreal Symphony Orchestra (rec. May 16, 1991 Decca)
 Sir Charles Mackerras conducting the Danish National Radio Symphony Orchestra; (this version is based on Janáček's original manuscripts) (rec. 1993, Chandos)
 Riccardo Chailly conducting the Vienna Philharmonic Orchestra with the choir of the Slovak Philharmonic (rec. June 8–9, 1997, Decca)
 Ladislav Slovák conducting the Slovak Philharmonic; date of recording unclear, released by Music deLux
 Sir Andrew Davis conducting the BBC Symphony Orchestra and Chorus (rec. live 2000 at BBC Proms)
 Antoni Wit conducting the Warsaw National Philharmonic Orchestra (rec. 2010, Naxos)
 Marek Janowski conducting the Berlin Radio Symphony Orchestra (rec. 2012, PentaTone)
 Tomáš Netopil conducting the Prague Radio Symphony Orchestra and Prague Philharmonic Choir (rec. 2013) (Based on original performance version)
 Edward Gardner conducting the Bergen Philharmonic Orchestra (rec. 2015, Chandos)
 The "Postludium" has been recorded as a stand-alone organ piece by a number of concert organists.

Arrangements
 Arrangement suitable for: solo soprano, alto, tenor and bass, mixed chorus, organ and orchestra
 arrangement for: wind orchestra
 arrangement by: Karel Bělohoubek
 performed by: Czech Army Central Band, co Karel Bělohoubek
 Arrangement suitable for: solo soprano, alto, tenor and bass, mixed chorus, organ and orchestra
 arrangement for: wind orchestra
 arrangement by: Josef Šebesta
 performed by: Prague Castle Guard and Police Wind Orchestra, co Rudolf Rydval
 Arrangement suitable for: opera
 arrangement for: fantasy from the opera for saloon orchestra
 arrangement by: E. Bauer
 performed by: Dolfi Dauber Saloon Orchestra, co Dolfi Dauber
 Arrangement suitable for: opera
 arrangement for: orchestral suite from the opera
 arrangement by: Peter Breiner
 performed by: New Zealand Symphony Orchestra, co  Peter Breiner

In film
The Glagolitic Mass was used for the music in the 1954 film Inauguration of the Pleasure Dome by director Kenneth Anger.

Other composers
There are a few other compositions of this genre in existence. Other composers of a Glagolitic Mass include J. B. Foerster, František Zdeněk Skuherský, Alexander Gretchaninov, the Prague organist Bedřich Antonín Wiedermann, and more recently, in the 1950s by the Czech polymath Jan Křesadlo. These Glagolitic masses were perhaps romantic expressions of so-called pan-Slavism and that of Janáček, an agnostic, may also possibly be so regarded.

References

External links

  Hitchcock's Films Revisited by Robin Wood (discussion of the mass' pagan character), Columbia University Press, 1989. 
 Janáček’s Glagolitic mess: Notes on the text of the Glagolitic Mass and pronunciation guide. Prepared for the ASOC by Keith Langston, UGA Dept. of Germanic and Slavic Studies

Masses (music)
Compositions by Leoš Janáček
Music for orchestra and organ
1926 compositions